Handsley Valley is a small ice-free valley between Knobhead and Mount Handsley in the Quartermain Mountains of Victoria Land, Antarctica. It was named by the New Zealand Geographic Board in 1993 in association with Mount Handsley.

References

Valleys of Victoria Land
Scott Coast